Waterford Bus Station serves the city of Waterford in the south-east of Ireland. It is situated on the quay in Waterford. It was opened in 1987 and redeveloped in 2000.

There are 16 stands for buses.  The station has a shop, travel centre, security offices, toilets and ticket desk and machines.  The bus station is used by Bus Éireann for regional services mainly although some city centre services depart form the station.  Most city centre buses depart from the Clock Tower bus stop beside the station.  At night buses do not stay at the station as it is a very open area and buses go to a depot in the city.

Gallery

See also 
 Bus Éireann
 Transport 21

External links
Bus Eireann

References

Transport in County Waterford
Bus stations in Ireland